The Mexican Secretariat of Labor and Social Welfare (STPS) is a Federal Government Department in charge of all social health services in the Mexican Republic. The Secretary is a member of the federal executive cabinet. In addition to the legal Executive Cabinet there are other Cabinet-level administration offices that report directly to the President of the Republic, and the Secretary of Labor and Social Welfare is appointed by the President of Mexico.
Supervises the implementation of the regulations in Article 123 concerning labor.
Attempts to achieve a balance between production factors, in keeping with the appropriate legal regulations.

List of secretaries

See also
 Social Welfare in Mexico

References

External links 
Official Website of Labor and Social Welfare
Official site of the President's Cabinet

Labor

Labor